The 2001 Lafayette Leopards football team represented Lafayette College in the 2001 NCAA Division I-AA football season. The team was led by Frank Tavani, in his second season as head coach. The Leopards played their home games at Fisher Field in Easton, Pennsylvania.

Lafayette's September 15 game at Princeton was canceled due to college football's collective decision to postpone games following the September 11 attacks.

Schedule

Most games were televised on LSN, the Lafayette Sports Network.

References

Lafayette
Lafayette Leopards football seasons
Lafayette Leopards football